Woodbridge is a suburb of Perth, Western Australia, located within the City of Swan local government area. Formerly part of Midland and previously informally named West Midland, its name is from the original farm established in 1830.

On 4 October 2004, Transperth renamed the West Midland railway station to Woodbridge station. The station is part of the Midland railway line which serves the eastern suburbs as a rapid transit railway.

Woodbridge House, a National Trust property on the edge of the Swan River, is now a museum that is open to the public.

Governor Stirling Senior High School is within the locality.

References

 
Suburbs of Perth, Western Australia
Suburbs and localities in the City of Swan
1830 establishments in Australia